Dichlorotetrakis(pyridine)iron(II) is the coordination complex with the formula FeCl2(pyridine)4.  A yellow solid, it is a prominent example of a transition metal pyridine complex. It is used as an anhydrous precursor to other iron complexes and catalysts. According to X-ray crystallography, the chloride ligands are mutually trans. The complex has a high spin configuration.  A monohydrate as well as several related complexes are known, e.g. CoCl2(pyridine)4 and NiCl2(pyridine)4.  It is prepared by treating ferrous chloride with an excess of pyridine.

References

Iron(II) compounds
Iron complexes
Chloro complexes
Pyridine complexes